Hıdırlık can refer to:

 Hıdırlık Tower
 Hıdırlık, Çankırı